The UMass Minutemen men's lacrosse team represents the University of Massachusetts Amherst in National Collegiate Athletic Association (NCAA) NCAA Division I men's lacrosse. As of July 1, 2022, the Minutemen compete in their full-time home of the Atlantic 10 Conference (A-10), which is establishing a men's lacrosse league.

History
UMass had competed in the ECAC Lacrosse League since 2000, but in 2010 transferred to the Colonial Athletic Association (CAA). They play their home games at Garber Field in Amherst, Massachusetts. The Minutemen have fielded a varsity team since 1954.  Since that time, there have only named 4 head coaches:  Al Goodyear in 1954, Dick Garber (after which the present lacrosse field is named) from 1955-1990, Ted Garber from 1991-1994, and the present coach Greg Cannella beginning in 1995.

They have been New England ILA Champions 21 times (1963, 1969, 1974, 1976, 1977, 1978, 1979, 1981, 1984, 1986, 1987, 1988, 1989, 1990, 1993, 1997, 2002, 2003, 2005, and 2006).  Prior to the NCAA, they reached the semifinals in the USILA tournament in 1972 and 1973.

UMass reached the NCAA finals in 2006, becoming just the third unseeded team to reach the finals. In the 2002 tournament, the Minutemen came closest to another Final Four appearance, scoring two goals in the final 25 seconds of regulation to tie their game, but losing to Johns Hopkins in overtime.

Notable players and coaches
 Roy Condon
 Kevin Leveille
 Sal LoCascio
 Will Manny
 Mark Millon
 Sean Morris
 Jeff Zywicki

Season results
The following is a list of UMass's results by season since the institution of NCAA Division I in 1971:

{| class="wikitable"

|- align="center"

†NCAA canceled 2020 collegiate activities due to COVID-19.

See also
2006 NCAA Division I Men's Lacrosse Championship
Doc Schneider

Footnotes

References

External links
 

College men's lacrosse teams in the United States
Lacrosse, Men's
Atlantic 10 Conference men's lacrosse
Lacrosse teams in Massachusetts